Grandpont Bridge is a footbridge across the River Thames near the centre of Oxford, England. It links Friars Wharf in St Ebbes on the north bank to the Geoffrey Arthur Building of Pembroke College, built in 1990, and the Grandpont area. It crosses the Thames on the reach between Iffley Lock and Osney Lock.

The bridge is also used by cyclists.  It lies on the Hanson Way, part of National Cycle Network route 5.

The Environment Agency refers to the bridge as "Grandpont Bridge".  Other sources also call the bridge "Oxford footbridge",
and "Gasworks Pipe Bridge", the name being for the town gas, chiefly methane, produced by the treatment of coal and its less congealed coke form in particular.

The bridge was built in the 1930s.  The bridge only carried a utility pipe and lacked a walkway in 1977.
Following a survey which revealed a danger of collapse, it was closed to traffic in March 2021.

The bridge takes its name from Grandpont, the area south of the bridge, which itself takes its name from a much earlier bridge-causeway which included the next bridge downstream, now known as Folly Bridge.

References

See also
Crossings of the River Thames

Pedestrian bridges across the River Thames
Bridges in Oxford
Pembroke College, Oxford